The Kyoto Himba Stakes (Japanese 京都牝馬ステークス) is a Grade 3 horse race for Thoroughbred fillies and mares aged four and over, run in February over a distance of 1400 metres on turf at Kyoto Racecourse.

The Kyoto Himba Stakes was first run in 1954 and has held Grade 3 status since 1984. The distance was usually 1600 metres before being cut to 1400 metres in 2016. The race was run at Chukyo Racecourse in 1979 and at Hanshin Racecourse in 1980, 1990 and 1994.

Winners since 2000

Earlier winners

 1984 - Calstone Dancer
 1985 - Fire Dancer
 1986 - Dominus Rose
 1987 - Pot Tesco Lady
 1988 - Mayano Jo O
 1989 - Rikiai Northern
 1990 - Rikiai Northern
 1991 - Daiichi Ruby
 1992 - Scarlet Bouquet
 1993 - Nuevo Tosho
 1994 - North Flight
 1995 - Sistina
 1996 - Syourinomegami
 1997 - Eishin Berlin
 1998 - Biwa Heidi
 1999 - Maruka Kimachi

See also
 Horse racing in Japan
 List of Japanese flat horse races

References

Turf races in Japan